Carduncellus is a genus of flowering plants in the family Asteraceae. They are native to the western Mediterranean and surrounding regions.

The taxonomy of the genus is still unclear. It is closely related to the genus Carthamus, and the two groups have been treated as part of a species complex, with the boundaries between them not established. While some sources accept several names in Carduncellus, others are more restrictive, and some consider the genus to be synonymous with Carthamus, the genus that includes the safflower.

 Accepted species
 Carduncellus coeruleus C.Presl - Italy
 Carduncellus hispanicus  Boiss. - Spain
 Carduncellus mairei Hanelt - Algeria
 Carduncellus monspeliensis St.-Lag. - Provence, Liguria

References

Further reading
  López González, G. (2012). Sobre la clasificación del complejo Carthamus-Carduncellus (Asteraceae, Cardueae-Centaureinae) y su tratamiento en flora ibérica. Acta Botanica Malacitana 37, 79–92.

Asteraceae genera
Cynareae